The 1999 Kwara State gubernatorial election occurred in Nigeria on January 9, 1999. The APP nominee Mohammed Lawal won the election, defeating the PDP candidate.

Mohammed Lawal emerged APP candidate.

Electoral system
The Governor of Kwara State is elected using the plurality voting system.

Primary election

APP primary
The APP primary election was won by Mohammed Lawal.

Results
The total number of registered voters in the state was 940,425. Total number of votes cast was 585,468 while number of valid votes was 567,568. Rejected votes were 17,900.

References 

Kwara State gubernatorial elections
Kwara State gubernatorial election
Kwara State gubernatorial election
Kwara State gubernatorial election